VBW may refer to:
 Video bandwidth (spectrum analysis), used in electronic signal processing
 Air Burkina, airline with ICAO identification "VBW"
 Vereinigte Bühnen Wien, musical production company based in Vienna
 Vereinigte Bern–Worb-Bahnen, a former Swiss light railway in Bern